Three consecutive Extradosed bridges are part of a north beltway of La Paz in Bolivia.

The project was funded by CAF (Corporación Andina de Fomento) through a credit to the Municipality in 2006. In 2007, the Municipal Government of La Paz awarded the design and construction of The Triplets Bridge Project to the JV “Consorcio Asociación Accidental Progreso”. As part of this contract, PEDELTA carried out the conceptual and final detailed design.

After a study of alternatives, where the bridge should have a cable supported deck in order to fulfill the technical specifications of the contract, it was proposed to modify the structural type to improve the visual impact on the landscape of La Paz. Therefore, it was proposed an extradosed bridge type, which reduces the height of the pylon, and a single plane of stays to allow a more transparent view

Description
The Triplets have similar structural pattern and basic idea, but the dimensions are different. All bridges are extradosed with a three-span deck and single central plane of stays.

The deck is connected monolithically with the two piers, forming a portal frame, and rests on neoprene bearings at the abutments.
The piers, with a single shaft in their full height, are made of reinforced concrete. Some of the piers reach 40 m in height. The pylon coincides with the pier axis under the box girder.

The geometric main features of the bridges are as follows:

Kantutani Bridge: the bridge has three spans of 
Choqueyapu Bridge: the bridge has three spans of 
Orkojahuira Bridge: the bridge has three spans of 

The total cost of the structure was approximately US$18.3 million.

The project was awarded with the Eugene C. Figg, Jr. Medal for Signature Bridges at the International Bridge Conference (Pittsburgh, June 2012),
at a city that also has 3 very similar bridges -- Three Sisters (Pittsburgh).

Construction
The bridge construction began in November 2007 and was completed in mid-2010 to coincide with the commemoration of the Bicentennial of Independence.

References

External links
 
 
 
 
 
 
 

Extradosed bridges
Extradosed bridges in Bolivia
Bridges in Bolivia
Bridges completed in 2010
Concrete bridges
2010 establishments in Bolivia